Omalur taluk is a taluk of Salem district of the Indian state of Tamil Nadu. The headquarters of the taluk is the town of Omalur.

Demographics
According to the 2011 census, the taluk of Omalur had a population of 494,861 with 259,550  males and 235,311 females. There were 907 women for every 1000 men. The taluk had a literacy rate of 60.1%. Child population in the age group below 6 was 25,502 Males and 23,203 Females.

References 

Taluks of Salem district